William Jacobsen may refer to:
 William S. Jacobsen, U.S. Representative from Iowa
 William Ludwig Jacobsen, American ambassador to Guinea-Bissau